Marnie is an opera by Nico Muhly to a libretto by Nicholas Wright based on the 1961 novel by Winston Graham.

Performance history
The opera was commissioned by the Metropolitan Opera of New York and was first performed in a co-production of the Met and the English National Opera. The production design, which employed video projections, was by Julian Crouch and 59 Productions, the costumes, by Arianne Phillips, and the stage lighting, by Kevin Adams. The opera premiered at the English National Opera in London on November 18, 2017, and at the Met in New York on October 19, 2018, both directed by Michael Mayer. The New York performances, conducted by Robert Spano (in his Met debut), featured Isabel Leonard (Marnie), Christopher Maltman (Mark Rutland), Iestyn Davies (Terry Rutland), Anthony Dean Griffey (Mr Strutt), Denyce Graves (Marnie's Mother), Ashley Emerson (Laura Fleet), Stacey Tappan (Dawn), Marie Te Hapuku (Miss Fedder), and Ian Koziara (Derek). The seventh and last performance of Marnie in the New York season was transmitted in high-definition video as part of the Metropolitan Opera Live in HD series. It is now available for streaming at Met Opera on Demand with a subscription or rental fee, but was provided free of charge on April 30 and November 24, 2020, and on June 28, 2021.

Roles
In an interview during the Met Opera's 2018 Live in HD stream of the opera, Muhly said that he wrote the role of Marnie with mezzo-soprano Isabel Leonard in mind. She performed the title role in the opera's American premiere, at the Metropolitan Opera, but the role was performed by Sasha Cooke in the world premiere.

References

Further reading

External links
Synopsis at MetOpera.org
Score details, Music Sales Group
Marnie, Met Opera on Demand

2017 operas
Operas by Nico Muhly
English-language operas
Operas based on novels
Opera world premieres at the English National Opera
Operas
Plays by Nicholas Wright
Operas set in the British Isles
Operas set in the 20th century